Since 1959, the Oscar Mathisen Award (also known as the Oscar Mathisen Memorial Award, the Oscar Mathisen Memorial Trophy, and sometimes the Skating Oscar) is awarded annually for outstanding speed skating performance of the season. The award was introduced by Oslo Skøiteklub (Oslo Skating Club, OSK) to commemorate the legendary Norwegian speed skater Oscar Mathisen (1888–1954).

Until 1967, speed skaters could not win the award more than once and until 1987, women were not eligible to win the award.

The winner is awarded a miniature of the statue of Oscar Mathisen created by the sculptor Arne Durban. The statue is placed outside Frogner Stadium in Oslo, the venue of many of Oscar Mathisen's most memorable victories.

References

 Oscar Winners at Skateresults

Speed skating awards
Awards established in 1959